The Kilmarnock Thunder are an ice hockey team based in Kilmarnock, Scotland. They currently play in the Scottish National League.

Season-by-season record

Club roster 2020–21

2020/21 Outgoing

References 

Ice hockey teams in Scotland
Sport in Kilmarnock